The Herdic Phaeton Company was a late 19th Century horse drawn stagecoach company in Washington, D.C.  It started operations in December 1879, taking over for a horse-drawn chariot company that had operated unsuccessfully for three years. The company took its name from the chariot's designer Peter H. Herdic of Wilmington, Delaware. They ran plushy upholstered carriages from 22nd and G Streets NW along G Street and Pennsylvania Avenue to the Navy Yard competing directly with the Washington and Georgetown streetcars. The company was more successful than the chariot company and continued to expand until 1887.

History 
In December of 1879, the Herdic Phaeton Company began operations. At its conception, the company operated a single route from 22nd and G Streets NW along G Street and Pennsylvania Avenue to the Navy Yard. Land was purchased at 10th and C Streets SE for the stables that would house the Herdic phaeton Company horses.      

In 1883, the Herdic Phaeton Company expanded its operations and established a new route started at 11th and East Capitol Streets and travelled through East Capital Streets, Pennsylvania Avenue NW, and 15th Street NW. The line  and ended at 15th and F streets.    

In 1884, the Washington and Georgetown Railroad Company increased their presence around the Herdic Phaeton Company's 15th Street route. In response to the increasing competition on 15th street and the need for public transportation of 16th Street, the Herdic Phaeton Company rerouted its lines from 15th to 16th Street.      

In 1886, the Herdic Phaeton Company expanded its operations for the last time,  establishing new lines along I and K Streets. 

Following the expansion of the Herdic chariot routes, the Herdic Phaeton Company received a permit to expand its stables in 1886.

Despite the expansion, the Herdic Phaeton Company began its decline in the years following 1886. By 1887 the Herdic Phaeton Company began to discontinue parts of its original lines as it struggled to compete with the Columbia Railway Company.  

The Herdic Phaeton Company go on to serve the public for the next decade until Commodore Potts, the company's principal stockholder, died in 1896. Immediately thereafter, the Herdic Phaeton Company officially and indefinitely ceased its operations.    

The Herdics were still run by the Metropolitan Coach Company after to dissolution of the Herdic Phaeton Company, but they were eventually phased out when the Metropolitan Coach Company began operating buses powered by gasoline motors in 1909.

Photo of a Herdic Omnibus and gingerbread waiting station at Lafayette Square in 1891.

Two of the company's waiting stations, nicknamed "herdics", still exist on the Capitol grounds near the East Front.

References

External links 
 Capitol Grounds "herdics"

Transportation in Washington, D.C.